Baron Bagot, of Bagot's Bromley in the County of Stafford, is a title in the Peerage of Great Britain. It was created on 12 October 1780 for Sir William Bagot, 6th Baronet.

Bagot family
The Bagot family has held land in Staffordshire since at least the 11th century. One member of the family, Hervey Bagot, represented Staffordshire in Parliament and fought as a Royalist in the Civil War. He was High Sheriff of Staffordshire in 1626 and on 31 May 1627 he was created a baronet, of Blithfield Hall, in the County of Staffordshire, in the Baronetage of England. His son (the second Baronet), grandson (third Baronet) and great-grandson (fourth Baronet) also represented Staffordshire in the House of Commons.

The latter's son, the fifth Baronet, sat as a Member of Parliament for Staffordshire as well as for Newcastle-under-Lyme and Oxford University. He was succeeded by his son, the aforementioned sixth Baronet. He represented Staffordshire in Parliament as a Tory from 1754 to 1780. In the latter year he was raised to the peerage as Baron Bagot, of Bagot's Bromley in the County of Stafford. His grandson, the third Baron, sat as a Conservative Member of Parliament for Denbighshire and after entering the House of Lords served as a government whip under the Earl of Derby and Benjamin Disraeli.

On the death of his son, the fourth Baron, the line of the eldest son of the first Baron failed. The titles passed to his second cousin, the fifth Baron. He was the son of Vice-Admiral Henry Bagot, third son of the Right Reverend the Hon. Richard Bagot, Bishop of Oxford and of Bath and Wells, fifth son of the first Baron. He was succeeded by his first cousin once removed, the sixth Baron. He was the son of Reverend Lewis Richard Charles Bagot, eldest son of Reverend Charles Walter Bagot, fourth son of the aforementioned Richard Bagot, fifth son of the first Baron. When he died the titles were inherited by his first cousin, the seventh Baron. He was the son of Charles Frederick Heneage Bagot, fourth son of Reverend Charles Walter Bagot (see above). On his death the titles passed to his younger brother, the eighth Baron, and then to their half-brother, the ninth Baron.  the titles are held by the latter's son, the tenth Baron, who succeeded in 2001.

Since 30 June 2006, the present Baron Bagot has not successfully proven his succession to the baronetcy and is not therefore on the Official Roll of the Baronetage. However, the case is under review by the Registrar of the Baronetage.

The ancestral seat of the Bagot family is Blithfield Hall in Staffordshire. A junior branch of the Bagot family had their seat at Pype Hayes Hall, Warwickshire. Another junior branch have their seat at Levens Hall, Cumbria.

Coat of arms

The heraldic blazon for the coat of arms of the barony is: Ermine, two chevrons azure. This can be translated as: a white shield with black ermine spots, over the top two thin blue chevrons. Crest: out of a ducal coronet of five leaves or, a goat's head argent, armed gold; supporters: two goats argent, armed and bearded or; motto: Antiquum Obtinens "possessing antiquity".

Bagot baronets, of Blithfield Hall (1627)
Sir Hervey Bagot, 1st Baronet (1591–1660)
Sir Edward Bagot, 2nd Baronet (1616–1673)
Sir Walter Bagot, 3rd Baronet (1644–1704)
Sir Edward Bagot, 4th Baronet (1674–1712)
Sir Walter Wagstaffe Bagot, 5th Baronet (1702–1768)
Sir William Bagot, 6th Baronet (1728–1798) (created Baron Bagot in 1780)

Barons Bagot (1780)
William Bagot, 1st Baron Bagot (1728–1798)
William Bagot, 2nd Baron Bagot (1773–1856)
William Bagot, 3rd Baron Bagot (1811–1887)
William Bagot, 4th Baron Bagot (1857–1932)
Gerald William Bagot, 5th Baron Bagot (1866–1946)
Caryl Ernest Bagot, 6th Baron Bagot (1877–1961)
Harry Eric Bagot, 7th Baron Bagot (1894–1973)
Reginald Walter Bagot, 8th Baron Bagot (1897–1979)
Heneage Charles Bagot, 9th Baron Bagot (1914–2001)
Charles Hugh Shaun Bagot, 10th Baron Bagot (born 1944)

The heir presumptive is the present holder's third cousin, Julian William D'Arcy Bagot (born 1943).
There are no further heirs to the barony or baronetcy.

Male-line family tree

Bagot baronets, of Levens Hall (1913)
Sir Alan Bagot, 1st Baronet (1896–1920)

Other notable Bagots
Sir Charles Bagot (1781–1798), politician, diplomat and colonial administrator, fourth son of the 1st Baron.
Josceline Bagot (1854–1913), MP for Kendal, grandson of Sir Charles Bagot.
Rt Rev. Lewis Bagot (1740–1802), fifth son of the 5th Baronet.
Rt Rev. Richard Bagot (1782–1854), fifth son of the 1st Baron.
Rev. Walter Bagot (1731–1806), third son of the 5th Baronet.
Sir William Bagot (died 1407), politician, an ancestral uncle of the 1st Baronet.

See also
Blithfield Hall
Bagot baronets
Bagot goat
Levens Hall
Pype Hayes Hall

References

Further reading

Kidd, Charles, Williamson, David (editors). Debrett's Peerage and Baronetage (1990 edition). New York: St Martin's Press, 1990.

Bagot Memorials

External links
Guide to the Bagot Family Papers, 1428–1671 (bulk 1557–1671), Folger Shakespeare Library

Baronies in the Peerage of Great Britain
History of Staffordshire
People from the Borough of East Staffordshire
Noble titles created in 1780
1780 establishments in Great Britain